The Bahamas Bowl is an NCAA Division I Football Bowl Subdivision college football bowl game played annually in Nassau, Bahamas, at the 15,000-seat Thomas Robinson Stadium. First held in 2014, the Bowl has tie-ins with the Mid-American Conference and Conference USA.

History

The inaugural edition of the Bahamas Bowl, played in 2014, was the first major (FBS or historical equivalent) bowl game to be played outside the United States and Canada between two U.S. teams since the January 1, 1937, Bacardi Bowl in Havana, Cuba. The game featured teams from the Mid-American Conference and Conference USA; that conference matchup has continued annually. In July 2019, the MAC announced a continuation of its tie-in with the bowl through the 2025–26 football season.

From its inception to 2017, the game was sponsored by the Popeyes Louisiana Kitchen restaurant franchise and officially known as the Popeyes Bahamas Bowl. After Restaurant Brands International acquired Popeyes in 2017, they declined to renew sponsorship. Elk Grove Village, Illinois—"home to the largest industrial park in the United States"—picked up title sponsorship in 2018, with the bowl using the official naming of Makers Wanted Bahamas Bowl. The name lasted until Elk Grove Village ended its sponsorship in March 2020.  On May 25, 2022, it was announced that HomeTown Lenders would be the new title sponsor of the game.

The winning team is presented with a trophy, since 2016 named the Prime Minister's Trophy.

On October 2, 2020, the 2020 edition of the bowl was cancelled due to the COVID-19 pandemic and related travel restrictions.

Game results

Source:

MVPs

Most appearances
Updated through the December 2022 edition (8 games, 16 total appearances).

Teams with multiple appearances

Teams with a single appearance
Won: Buffalo, FIU, Ohio, Old Dominion, Western Kentucky, Western Michigan

Lost: Central Michigan, Charlotte, Eastern Michigan, Miami (OH)

Appearances by conference
Updated through the December 2022 edition (8 games, 16 total appearances).

Game records

Source:

Media coverage

Television

Radio

Elvis Gallegos served as the analyst following the death of Rob Best on October 4, 2020. During the 2021 bowl broadcast, Kyle Wiggs announced that the Bahamas Bowl broadcast booth had been renamed the Rob Best Broadcast Booth as a memorial to Best.

See also
 List of college football games played outside the United States

References

External links
 

 
2014 establishments in the Bahamas
American football in the Bahamas
Sports competitions in the Bahamas
College football bowls
Recurring sporting events established in 2014
Winter events in the Bahamas